Arrow In the Dust is a 1954 American western film directed by Lesley Selander and starring Sterling Hayden, Coleen Gray and Keith Larsen. Shot in Technicolor, it was produced and distributed by Allied Artists. The film is based on the 1954 novel Arrow in the Dust by L.L. Foreman.

Plot
Cavalry deserter Bart Laish comes upon an ambushed wagon and a mortally wounded major. The officer's dying request is for Laish to catch up to the remainder of the wagon train and help guide it safely to a fort.

Laish transports the major's body, then dons his uniform and assumes his identity when joining up with a wagon train that has been repeatedly attacked by Indians. He is resented at first by Christella Burke, who owns one of the wagons, and Lt. Steve King, who until now has been leading the wagon train. Laish also shoots a crew boss who challenges him.

Unable to understand why the Indians keep staging raids against these same wagons, Laish and scout Crowshaw distract them with cases of liquor. They also anger Tillotson, a trader, by using his large wagon as bait. Christella is impressed by Laish's bravery, then accidentally learns of his true identity. Crowshaw ends up shooting Tillotson, whose wagons are filled with guns and ammunition, including Henry repeating rifles, that the Indians have been after all along. Christella falls in love with Laish, who decides to turn himself in, with Lt. King offering to vouch for his character.

Cast

 Sterling Hayden as Laish
 Coleen Gray as Christella
 Carleton Young as Maj. Andy Pepperis
 Keith Larsen as Lt. Steve King
 John Pickard  as Sgt. Lybarger
 Jack Ingram as Cpl. Demington
 Jimmy Wakely as Pvt. Carqueville the singing soldier
 Tom Tully as Crowshaw
 Tudor Owen as Tillotson
 Lee Van Cleef as Crew Boss
 Iron Eyes Cody as Chief Rasacura 
 John Maxwell as George Owsley

References

Bibliography
 Pitts, Michael R. Western Movies: A Guide to 5,105 Feature Films. McFarland, 2012.

External links
 Arrow in the Dust at TCMDB
 
 
 

1954 films
1954 Western (genre) films
American Western (genre) films
1950s English-language films
Allied Artists films
Films directed by Lesley Selander
1950s American films